This is a list of fellows of the Royal Society elected in 1686.

Fellows 
William Molyneux  (1656–1698)
Clopton Havers  (1657–1702)
Sir Robert Gordon  (1647–1704)
St George Ashe  (1658–1718)
John Harwood  (1661–1731)
Sir Thomas Molyneux  (1661–1733)
Thomas Meres  (b. 1662)

References

1686
1686 in science
1686 in England